Edward Burns (born 1968) is an American actor and filmmaker.

Ed, Eddie, or Edward Burns may also refer to:
Ed Burns (born 1946), American author and screenwriter
Ed Burns (American football) (born 1954), American football player
Ed Burns (baseball) (1887–1942), Major League catcher
Ed "Big Ed" Burns, American con man
Eddie Burns (1916–2004), Australian rugby league player
Eddie "Guitar" Burns (1928–2012), American blues musician
Edward E. Burns (1858–1941), member of the Wisconsin State Senate
Edward F. Burns (1931–2019), Pennsylvania politician
Edward J. Burns (born 1957), Catholic Bishop of Dallas

See also
Edward Burns Ross (1881–1947), Scottish mathematician
Edd Byrnes (1932–2020), American actor
Edward Byrne (disambiguation)
Edmund Widdrington Byrne (1844–1904), British judge and politician
Thomas Edward Burns (born 1927), Ulster unionist politician
Edmund Burns (1892–1980), American silent film actor
Burns (surname)